The Willow project is an oil development project by ConocoPhillips located on the plain of the National Petroleum Reserve in Alaska, originally to construct and operate up to five drill pads for a total of 250 oil wells. Associated infrastructure includes access and infield roads, airstrips, pipelines, a gravel mine and a temporary island to facilitate module delivery via sealift barges on permafrost and between waters managed by the state of Alaska. 

Oil was discovered in the Willow prospect area west of Alpine, Alaska, in 2016, and in October 2020, the Bureau of Land Management (BLM) approved ConocoPhillips' Willow development project in its Record of Decision. After a court challenge in 2021, the BLM issued its final supplemental environmental impact statement (SEIS) in February 2023.

Alaskan lawmakers from both sides, as well as the Arctic Slope Regional Corporation, have supported the Willow project. On March 13, 2023, the Biden administration approved the project.

Environmentalist organization Earthjustice filed a lawsuit on March 14, 2023, on behalf of conservation groups to stop the Willow project, saying that the approval of a new carbon pollution source contradicts President Joe Biden's promises to slash greenhouse gas emissions in half by 2030 and transition the United States to clean energy.

The project could produce up to 600 million barrels of oil and 287 million tons of carbon emissions plus other greenhouse gases over 30 years. The project could adversely impact Arctic wildlife, Native American communities and all of human life. The Willow project would damage the complex local tundra ecosystem and, according to an older government estimate, release the same amount of greenhouse gases annually as half a million homes. The project is planned to start in 2027.

Geography
Willow prospect is located within the National Petroleum Reserve in Alaska, in a part called the Bear Tooth Unit West of Alpine, Alaska on native lands, located entirely on the arctic coastal plain, as depicted in Figure 3.9.2 of the final SEIS. This land consists of permafrost tundra, 94% of which is wetlands and 5% freshwater.

Expected oil extraction
Over its anticipated 30-year life, the Willow project could produce 200,000 barrels of oil per day, producing up to 600 million barrels of oil in total. According to estimates by the Bureau of Land Management (BLM), Willow could generate between $8 and $17 billion in revenue. The BLM's environmental impact statement found it would result in 287 million tons of carbon emissions plus other greenhouse gases.

In June 2021, officials at ConocoPhillips stated it had, "identified up to 3 billion barrels of oil equivalent of nearby prospects and leads with similar characteristics that could leverage the Willow infrastructure...[Willow] unlocks the West".

History
In 1999, ConocoPhillips acquired the first Willow-area leases in the northeast portion of the National Petroleum Reserve in Alaska called the Bear Tooth Unit.

In 2016, the final year of the Obama administration, ConocoPhillips drilled two oil exploration wells, which encountered "significant pay". It named this discovery Willow. In 2018, the second year of the Trump administration, it appraised the greater Willow area and discovered three additional oil prospects.

In May 2018, ConocoPhillips officially requested permission to develop the Willow prospect from the BLM, to construct and operate five drill pads with 50 oil wells each for a total of 250 oil wells including access and infield roads, airstrips, pipelines, a gravel mine and a temporary island to facilitate module delivery via sealift barges.

In August 2019, after a 44-day public scoping period and having consulted with 13 tribal entities and Alaska Native Claims Settlement Act corporations, the BLM published a draft master development plan.

In August 2020, during the last quarter of the Trump administration, the BLM approved the development of the ConocoPhillips project option. It foresees the construction of a new road. Although a roadless option would have aided caribou movements in the area, the BLM in its Willow master development project Record of Decision, published in October 2020, sided against the roadless option, because it felt the increase in air traffic would increase the overall disturbance. ConocoPhillips plans to use thermosiphons to freeze the melting permafrost ground, to keep it solid for the oil development infrastructure. Construction at that time was expected to take about nine years, to employ up to 1,650 seasonal workers, an average of 373 annual workers and about 406 full-time employees once operational.

In August 2021, the U.S. District Court for the District of Alaska challenged the BLM permit for the Willow project, because it "1) improperly excluded analysis of foreign greenhouse gas emissions, 2) improperly screened out alternatives from detailed analysis based on BLM's misunderstanding of leaseholders' rights (i.e., that leases purportedly afforded the right to extract 'all possible' oil and gas from each lease tract), and 3) failed to give due consideration to the requirement in the NPRPA to afford 'maximum protection' to significant surface values in the Teshekpuk Lake Special Area". According to documents received under the Freedom of Information Act, ConocoPhillips was then involved in analyzing the court's decision and participated in developing the next supplemental review.

In July 2022, the BLM released a draft SEIS in response to the District Court order.

In August 2022, the Alaska Native corporation of the village of Nuiqsut submitted comments to the draft SEIS favoring a reduced number of drill pads from five to four, shorter gravel roads and protection of Teshekpuk Lake.

On February 1, 2023, the BLM completed the final SEIS, approving the project with three drill pads with 50 oil wells each for a total of 150 oil wells. Alaskan lawmakers from both sides, including the congressional delegation (Senators Lisa Murkowski (R), Dan Sullivan (R) and Representative Mary Peltola (D)), as well as the Arctic Slope Regional Corporation have been supporting the Willow project. As of March 2023, the Department of the Interior permitted ConocoPhillips to build a new ice road from the existing Kuparuk road system at Kuparuk River Oil Field drill site and use a partially grounded ice bridge across the Colville River near Ocean Point "to transport sealift modules" to the Willow project drilling area.

As a final decision drew near, media attention and public interest increased dramatically, with a petition urging President Biden to "say no to the Willow Project", having been signed by more than 2.4 million people after widespread attention on the TikTok social-media site. 

On March 13, 2023, the Biden administration approved the project. Secretary of the Interior Deb Haaland refused to sign the approval; deputy secretary Tommy Beaudreau, a former fossil-fuel industry lawyer, did so at the behest of President Biden. In response, environmental groups announced their plans to sue.
Environmentalist organization Earthjustice filed a lawsuit on March 14, 2023, on behalf of conservation groups to stop the Willow project. Activists say that the approval of a new carbon pollution source contradicts President Joe Biden's promises to slash greenhouse gas emissions in half by 2030 and transition the United States to clean energy.

Environmental justice
In the final SEIS from February 2023, the BLM predicted adverse effects on public health, the subsistence and sociocultural system. The Nuiqsut population would be disproportionately affected with decreased food resource availability, decreased access to harvesting and increased food insecurity. It found the project would also adversely impact other Native American communities in Utqiaġvik, Anaktuvuk Pass, and Atqasuk.

The project could produce up to 600 million barrels of oil and 287 million tons of carbon emissions plus other greenhouse gases over 30 years. The BLM assessments predict the project will adversely impact Arctic wildlife, Native American communities. The Willow project would damage the complex local tundra ecosystem and, according to an older government estimate, release the same amount of greenhouse gases annually as half a million homes.

References

Further reading

2023 controversies in the United States
2023 in the environment
21st century in Alaska
21st century in the Arctic
Biden administration controversies
Environmental controversies
Environmental impact of the petroleum industry
Environment of Alaska
Geography of North Slope Borough, Alaska
Industry in the Arctic
Native American history of Alaska
Oil fields in Alaska
Petroleum in Alaska